Deh Pish-e Olya, also known as Deh Pish-e Bala, may refer to:
 Deh Pish-e Olya, Jiroft
 Deh Pish-e Olya, Kahnuj